Hypopyra meridionalis is a moth of the family Erebidae. It is found in Sri Lanka.

References

Moths described in 1913
Hypopyra
Moths of Sri Lanka